The Golden Bridge connects Ankleshwar to Bharuch in the Gujarat state of western India. It was built in 1881 by the British, who needed a bridge across the Narmada River to create better access to trade and administration officials in Bombay (now called Mumbai). The bridge is also called the Narmada Bridge.

Construction
The British started construction on the iron bridge on 7 December 1877. The bridge was contracted by the Bombay, Baroda, and Central India Railway and was designed by Sir John Hawkshaw. The bridge was completed on 16 May 1881 at a cost of Rs 45.65 lakhs. Originally named the Narmada Bridge, it came to be known as the Golden Bridge on account of the heavy expenditure incurred during construction due to damage from heavy water flow. 

After independence, it became part of the national highway. However, the flow of heavy traffic was reduced after a new bridge on Narmada was built. 

See also
 Silver Jubilee Railway Bridge Bharuch
 3rd Narmada Bridge

References

External links
 

Bridges completed in 1881
Bharuch district
Bridges over the Narmada River
Bridges in Gujarat
Transport in Ankleshwar
Transport in Bharuch
1881 establishments in India